Down to Their Last Yacht is a 1934 comic adventure produced and distributed by RKO Pictures.

Plot
After the stock market crash of 1929, the Colt-Stratton family is forced to rent their yacht to the nouveau riche at the behest of Nella Fitzgerald (Polly Moran), including gambler Barry Forbes (Sidney Blackmer) and his sidekick Freddy Finn (Sterling Holloway). When Freddy rigs the yacht's roulette wheel to respond to his saxophone, he is caught, but moments later, Captain "Sunny Jim" Roberts (Ned Sparks) runs the yacht aground on the South Sea Island of Malakamokolu, ruled by Queen Malakamokalu (Mary Boland), a white woman, who takes the passengers as forced labor. Tiring them, she offers to release them if Barry stays to marry her. However, once she hears Freddy play his saxophone, she falls in love with him and plans to blow up the yacht with a bomb. Barry manages to rescue the passengers, not the boat, and they accept their new home in the tropics.

Cast
 Mary Boland as Queen Malakamokalu
 Polly Moran as Nella Fitzgerald
 Ned Sparks as Captain "Sunny Jim" Roberts
 Sidney Fox as Linda Colt-Stratton
 Sidney Blackmer as Barry Forbes
 Sterling Holloway as Freddy Finn
 Marjorie Gateson as Mrs. Geoffrey Colt-Stratton
 Irene Franklin as Mrs. Gilhooley
 Charles Coleman as Sir Guy
 Felix Knight as Island Singer (uncredited)

Production
Two separate units were used to speed the production, one directed by producer Lou Brock and the other by director Paul Sloane. Sam White was hired to direct retakes, supervised by Brock, which involved re-shooting a quarter of the film. Brock was given carte blanche on the film, which went considerably over budget; it turned out to be his last production for RKO.

Reception
The New York Times review of the film called the movie "a sorry melange of Hollywood native dancing, theme-song singing and preposterous comedy."

The film was a box-office disappointment for RKO.

References
Notes

External links
Down to Their Last Yacht at IMDb.com
Down to Their Last Yacht ; allmovie.com synopsis

1934 films
1934 comedy films
American adventure comedy films
American black-and-white films
Films scored by Roy Webb
Films set on islands
RKO Pictures films
1930s adventure comedy films
Films directed by Paul Sloane
1930s English-language films
1930s American films